The limbless snake-tooth skink (Coeranoscincus frontalis)  is a species of skink. It is endemic to north-eastern Queensland, Australia. It is a large, fossorial skink that occurs in the rainforest of coastal ranges and lowlands.

Coeranoscincus frontalis measure  in snout–vent length. There are no external traces of the limbs.

References

Coeranoscincus
Endemic fauna of Australia
Skinks of Australia
Reptiles of Queensland
Reptiles described in 1888
Taxa named by Charles Walter De Vis